Mopeia mammarenavirus (MOPV) is a species of virus in the genus Mammarenavirus. It was initially isolated from the Mastomys natalensis mouse in the East African country of Mozambique in 1977. It is of the "Old World" Arenavirus lineage and is closely related to Lassa mammarenavirus, sharing 75% of its amino acid sequence.


Mopeia virus disease 
Mopeia virus has not been known to cause disease in humans, although it is capable of infecting human cell lines in vitro. Infection of primates with the virus was demonstrated to prevent clinical disease following Lassa virus infection, indicating potential for use as a prophylactic vaccine for Lassa Fever.

Geographic distribution 
Although initially isolated in Mozambique, it has also been detected in rodents in Zimbabwe, and Tanzania. Although not identified outside of these regions, it is possible that M. natalensis rodents could carry Mopeia virus to other areas of Southeast Africa.

References 

Arenaviridae